Hungarian folk music includes a broad array of Central European styles, including the recruitment dance verbunkos, the csárdás and nóta.

The name Népzene is also used for Hungarian folk music as an umbrella designation of a number of related styles of traditional folk music from Hungary and Hungarian minorities living in modern-day Austria, the, Czech Republic, Poland, Slovakia, central Romania (Transylvania) (Székely), Moldova (Csángó), and Serbia.

The obscure origins of Hungarian folk music formed among the peasant population in the early nineteenth century with roots dating even further back. However, its broader popularity was largely due to the Hungarian composer Franz Liszt, who in 1846 began composing 19 Hungarian Rhapsodies for piano, five of which were later orchestrated, thus being the first pieces of music by a major composer to incorporate sources from so-called “peasant music”. These works, which broke free from classical tradition, were often viewed by the elite as brash and unrefined, yet they deeply influenced others, like Johannes Brahms, and later Zoltán Kodály and Béla Bartók, even having an influence on American jazz.

During the 20th century, Hungarian composers were influenced by the traditional music of their nation which may be considered as a repeat of the early "nationalist" movement of the early 19th century (Beethoven) but is more accurately the artists' desire to escape the hegemony of the classical tradition manifold at that time. Béla Bartók took this departure into the abstract musical world in his appropriation of traditional Hungarian as the basis for symphonic creations.

Zoltán Kodály and Béla Bartók studied over 300 melodies, and noted that more modern tunes used for dancing featured pentatonic turns with frequent leaps in fourths.

Notable Hungarian folk bands and artists

See also
Culture of Hungary
 Kontra

Notes

External links
Hungarian Folk Music Collection: Népdalok and Magyar Nóta (8000 melodies).

 
Folk
Folk music by country